Congregation Shomrei Emunah is an Orthodox Jewish synagogue located in Borough Park, Brooklyn, New York. Founded in 1907, the congregation moved into its present edifice in 1910. Its current rabbinical leader is Rabbi Aviezer Cohen. Its current chazzan (cantor) is Chazzan Adler. The chazzan sheini (secondary cantor) is Chazzan Nachman Schneider (who is currently the chief cantor at Congregation Beth Israel of Borough Park & cantor emeritus at Congregation Young Israel of Laurence & Cederhurst.)

History
Congregation Shomrei Emunah was established in 1907 by a group that included a number of Torah scholars. It published its bylaws on September 3, 1907. In the beginning, services were held in a Masonic hall at New Utrecht Avenue and 56th Street. In 1910 the congregation constructed its own building at the corner of 14th Avenue and 52nd Street. The imposing, yellow-brick edifice designed in Romanesque Revival style features a large skylight over the bimah (reader's platform).

The subsequent founding of Beth El, Congregation
Anshei Sfard, and Bnai Yehuda drew membership from Shomrei Emunah, leading to the latter's sobriquet as "The Mother of Jewish Institutions" in Boro Park. Congregation members also played a role in the establishment of the Yeshivas Etz Chaim (the neighborhood’s first day school) and the Israel Zion Hospital (today Maimonides Medical Center). In the early years of the congregation, the Chofetz Chaim had advised Torah scholars traveling to America that they should turn to Shomrei Emunah upon their arrival. Rabbis who have addressed the congregation include Rabbi Elchonon Wasserman, Rabbi Abraham Isaac Kook and Rabbi Boruch Ber Leibowitz.

Rabbinic leadership
The synagogue installed its first rabbi in 1926. From 1928 to 1935 the spiritual leader was Rabbi Wolf Gold, a founder of the Williamsburg Talmud Torah and Mesivta Torah Vodaas. From 1935 through 1973, Dr. Harry I. Wohlberg, a professor of Bible and homiletic literature at Yeshiva University, was the synagogue rabbi. Wohlberg was the first rabbi to receive a lifetime contract from an American Orthodox synagogue.
From 1973 through 2008, the synagogue was led by the renowned Rabbi Yaakov Pollack.
Since 2008, the synagogue's spiritual leader is Rabbi Aviezer Cohen, who was educated in Yeshivas Brisk under the tutelage of Rabbi Berel Soloveitchik.

Activities
The synagogue made a name for itself in the Borough Park community with its strong emphasis on Torah study. In 1918 it founded a Chevra Shas (Talmud study society) and afterwards introduced other study groups on Bible, Mishnah, Midrash, Ein Yaakov, Chayei Adam, and Rif. In 1935 it inaugurated a Chevra Mishnayas U’Gemilas Chesed, which combines group study of Mishnayos with the distribution of interest-free loans to individuals and organizations. The emphasis on Torah study made the synagogue popular among former yeshiva students and residents interested in continuing their study of Torah and halakha (Jewish law) on Shabbat and during their free time; it also made the synagogue a popular stopping-point for visiting European Torah scholars.

In response to news of the Kristallnacht pogrom in November 1938, Shomrei Emunah held a public gathering "where FDR was praised for his stance on behalf of Jews".

In 2009 the synagogue was targeted for an anti-Jewish protest by members of the Westboro Baptist Church led by Fred Phelps.

References

Orthodox synagogues in New York City
Synagogues completed in 1910
Synagogues in Brooklyn
1907 establishments in New York City
Romanesque Revival synagogues